The women's 200 metres event at the 1978 Commonwealth Games was held on 8 and 10 August at the Commonwealth Stadium in Edmonton, Alberta, Canada.

Medalists

Results

Heats
Held on 8 August

Qualification: First 3 in each heat (Q) and the next 1 fastest (q) qualify for the semifinals.

Wind:Heat 1: +3.3 m/s, Heat 2: ? m/s, Heat 3: +2.7 m/s, Heat 4: +5.5 m/s, Heat 5: ? m/s

Semifinals
Held on 8 August

Qualification: First 4 in each semifinal (Q) qualify directly for the final.

Wind:Heat 1: ? m/s, Heat 2: +2.1 m/s

Final
Held on 10 August

Wind: +5.1 m/s

References

Heats & Semifinals results (The Canberra Times)
Final results (The Canberra Times)
Australian results

Athletics at the 1978 Commonwealth Games
1978